Russian Roulette is the seventh studio album by German heavy metal band Accept, released in 1986. It was again recorded at Dierks-Studios, but the band chose to self-produce rather than bring back Dieter Dierks as producer. It would be the last Accept album to feature Udo Dirkschneider as lead vocalist until the 1993 reunion album Objection Overruled.

The album returns Accept to the darker, heavier sound of releases prior to the more commercial-sounding predecessor Metal Heart. Wolf Hoffmann explained the band's decision: "Maybe we were trying sort of go back to our natural and not polished Accept sound with that record. We weren't really all that happy with the polished and clean-sounding Metal Heart. I was sort of very happy with my guitar playing on that record and very happy with my parts, but I remember the whole vibe of the band was at the time that we don't want to go through this again with Dieter Dierks who had produced Metal Heart."

Peter Baltes explained the album's title and front cover as an expression of the strong anti-war themes throughout the record, showing war as a game of Russian roulette: "It means - go and play the game y'know, what a silly game it is. One will die definitely."

The digitally remastered CD edition includes live versions of "Metal Heart" and "Screaming for a Love-Bite" as bonus tracks, taken from the Kaizoku-Ban EP. The 2014 release from UK based record label Hear No Evil Recordings features live versions of "Neon Nights", "Burning" and "Head Over Heels", taken from the 1990 live album Staying a Life.

Track listing
All lyrics and music written by Accept and Deaffy.

Credits
Band members
Udo Dirkschneider – vocals
Wolf Hoffmann – guitars
Jörg Fischer – guitars
Peter Baltes – bass guitar
Stefan Kaufmann – drums

Production
Michael Wagener – engineer
Mark Dodson – mixing
Bob Ludwig – mastering at Masterdisk, New York
Gaby "Deaffy" Hauke – management, cover concept
Didi Zill Bravo – cover photo
Produced and arranged by Accept for Breeze Music Gmbh

Charts

See also
 List of anti-war songs

References

1986 albums
Accept (band) albums
Portrait Records albums
RCA Records albums